Jean Colbach (born 2 January 1897, date of death unknown) was a Luxembourgian sprinter. He competed in the men's 100 metres at the 1920 Summer Olympics.

References

External links
 

1897 births
Year of death missing
Athletes (track and field) at the 1920 Summer Olympics
Luxembourgian male sprinters
Olympic athletes of Luxembourg
Sportspeople from Lima